Hinduism in Ireland may refer to:

 Hinduism in the Republic of Ireland
 Hinduism in Northern Ireland

Ireland